The Canadian Cross Country Championships is the annual national championships for cross country running in Canada. The 2014 event took place in Vancouver, British Columbia. The event will be hosted in Kingston, Ontario from 2015 to 2018.

References

National cross country running competitions
Cross country running in Canada
Cross